Unione Calcio Montecchio Maggiore is an Italian association football club located in Montecchio Maggiore, Veneto. It currently plays in Eccellenza.

History 
Th eclub was founded in 1923.

At the end of the 2010–11 Serie D season, the club was relegated to Eccellenza after the play-off, but was later readmitted after a judgment of the High Court of Justice changed the result of the match Montebelluna-Este from 2–1 to 0–3.

In the season 2011–12 it was relegated to Eccellenza.

Colors and badge 
Its colors are white and red.

References

External links
Team tab

Football clubs in Italy
Association football clubs established in 1923
Football clubs in Veneto
1923 establishments in Italy